This is the breakdown of the results of the 1997 United Kingdom general election by constituency. The results are listed by nation, region and/or county.

 Bold indicates the candidate that was elected MP
 † represents that the incumbent did not run again.
 § represents that the incumbent was defeated for nomination.
 ₰ represents that the incumbent was disqualified from their nomination contest.
 ‡ represents that the incumbent contested a different constituency.

Breakdown by regions

England 

England elected 529 out of the 659 Members of Parliament across the 9 regions of England.

East Midlands 

The East Midlands elected 44 Members of Parliament across 6 counties; Derbyshire, Leicestershire, Lincolnshire, Northamptonshire, Nottinghamshire and Rutland.

Derbyshire 
Derbyshire elected 10 Members of Parliament in 10 seats – 2 borough and 8 county constituencies.

Leicestershire and Rutland 
Leicestershire and Rutland elected 10 Members of Parliament in 10 seats – 3 borough and 7 county constituencies.

Lincolnshire 
Lincolnshire elected 7 Members of Parliament in 7 seats – 1 borough and 6 county constituencies. This excludes (North Lincolnshire and North East Lincolnshire) which are included as part of Humberside.

Northamptonshire 
Northamptonshire elected 6 Members of Parliament in 6 seats – 2 borough and 4 county constituencies.

Nottinghamshire 
Nottinghamshire elected 11 Members of Parliament in 11 seats – 3 borough and 8 county constituencies.

East of England 

The East of England elected 56 Members of Parliament across 6 counties; Bedfordshire, Cambridgeshire, Essex, Hertfordshire, Norfolk and Suffolk.

Bedfordshire 
Bedfordshire elected 6 Members of Parliament in 6 seats – 3 borough and 3 county constituencies.

Cambridgeshire 
Cambridgeshire elected 7 Members of Parliament in 7 seats – 2 borough constituencies and 5 county constituencies.

Essex 
Essex elected 17 Members of Parliament in 17 seats – 5 borough constituencies and 12 county constituencies.

Hertfordshire 
Hertfordshire elected 11 Members of Parliament in 11 seats – 2 borough constituencies and 9 county constituencies.

Norfolk 
Norfolk elected 8 Members of Parliament in 8 seats – 2 borough constituencies and 6 county constituencies.

Suffolk 
Suffolk elected 7 Members of Parliament in 7 seats – 1 borough constituency and 6 county constituencies.

Greater London 

Greater London elected 74 Members of Parliament across the 32 boroughs of London.

North East London 
North East London elected 23 Members of Parliament across the boroughs of Enfield, Haringey, Islington, Hackney, Tower Hamlets, Newham, Waltham Forest, Redbridge, Barking and Dagenham and Havering.

North West London 
North West London elected 20 Members of Parliament across the boroughs of Hillingdon, Harrow, Brent, Ealing, Barnet, Camden, Hammersmith and Fulham, Kensington and Chelsea, the City of Westminster, and the City of London.

South East London 
South East London elected 16 Members of Parliament across the boroughs of Lambeth, Southwark, Lewisham, Bromley, Greenwich and Bexley.

South West London 
South West London elected 15 Members of Parliament across the boroughs of Hounslow, Richmond upon Thames, Kingston upon Thames, Wandsworth, Merton, Sutton and Croydon.

North East England 

North East England elected 30 Members of Parliament across the 4 counties of England's least populated region; Cleveland, County Durham, Northumberland and Tyne and Wear.

Cleveland 

Cleveland elected 6 Members of Parliament in 6 seats – 5 borough constituencies and 1 county constituency.

County Durham 

County Durham elected 7 Members of Parliament in 7 seats – 1 borough constituency and 6 county constituencies.

Northumberland 

Northumberland elected 4 Members of Parliament in 4 seats – 1 borough constituency and 3 county constituencies.

Tyne and Wear 

Tyne and Wear elected 13 Members of Parliament in 13 seats – 13 borough constituencies.

Newcastle and Tyneside 
Newcastle and North Tyneside and South Tyneside elected 7 Members of Parliament.

Gateshead and Sunderland 
Gateshead and Sunderland elected 6 Members of Parliament.

North West England 

North West England elected 76 Members of Parliament across 5 counties; Cheshire, Cumbria, Greater Manchester, Lancashire and Merseyside.

Cheshire 

Cheshire elected 11 Members of Parliament in 11 seats – 2 borough constituencies and 9 county constituencies.

Cumbria 

Cumbria elected 6 Members of Parliament in 1 borough constituency and 5 county constituencies.

Greater Manchester 

Greater Manchester elected 27 Members of Parliament.

City of Manchester 
The City of Manchester and Sale elected 6 Members of Parliament in 6 borough constituencies.

Eastern Greater Manchester 
The four eastern districts of Oldham, Rochdale Stockport and Tameside elected 11 Members of Parliament.

Western Greater Manchester 
The five western districts of Bolton, Bury, Salford, Trafford and Wigan elected elected 12 Members of Parliament.

Lancashire 

Lancashire elected 15 Members of Parliament.

Merseyside 

Merseyside elected 15 Members of Parliament.

City of Liverpool 
The City of Liverpool elected 5 Members of Parliament in 5 borough constituencies.

Knowsley, Sefton and St Helens 
The three districts east of the City of Liverpool; Knowsley, Sefton and St Helens.

Wirral 
The district of Wirral elected 4 Members of Parliament in 2 borough constituencies and 2 county constituencies.

South East England 

South East England, the most populous region, elected 83 Members of Parliament across 9 counties; Berkshire, Buckinghamshire, East and West Sussex, Hampshire, Isle of Wight, Kent, Oxfordshire and Surrey.

Berkshire 
Berkshire elected 8 Members of Parliament in 8 seats – 2 borough constituencies and 6 county constituencies.

Buckinghamshire 
Buckinghamshire elected 7 Members of Parliament in 7 seats – 1 borough and 6 county constituencies.

East Sussex 
East Sussex elected 8 Members of Parliament in 8 parliamentary constituencies – 4 borough constituencies and 4 county constituencies.

Hampshire 

Hampshire elected 17 Members of Parliament in 17 parliamentary constituencies – 7 borough constituencies and 10 county constituencies.

Isle of Wight 
The Isle of Wight elected 1 Member of Parliament in 1 parliamentary constituency.

Kent 

Kent elected 17 Members of Parliament in 17 parliamentary constituencies – 1 borough constituency and 16 county constituencies.

Oxfordshire 

Oxfordshire elected 6 Members of Parliament in 6 parliamentary constituencies – 1 borough constituency and 5 county constituencies.

Surrey 
Surrey elected 11 Members of Parliament in 11 parliamentary constituencies – 4 borough constituencies and 7 county constituencies.

West Sussex 
West Sussex elected 8 Members of Parliament in 8 parliamentary constituencies – 2 borough constituencies and 6 county constituencies.

South West England 

South West England, elected 51 Members of Parliament across 7 counties; Bristol, Cornwall, Devon, Dorset, Gloucestershire, Somerset and Wiltshire

Bristol 
Bristol elected 4 Members of Parliament in 4 seats – 4 borough constituencies.

Cornwall 
Cornwall elected 5 Members of Parliament in 5 seats – 5 county constituencies.

Devon 

Devon elected 11 Members of Parliament in 11 seats – 7 county constituencies and 4 borough constituencies.

Dorset 

Dorset elected 8 Members of Parliament in 8 seats – 5 county constituencies and 3 borough constituencies.

Gloucestershire 

Gloucestershire elected 8 Members of Parliament in 8 seats.

Somerset 

Somerset elected 9 Members of Parliament in 9 seats.

Wiltshire 

Wiltshire elected 6 Members of Parliament in 6 seats – 6 county constituencies

West Midlands 

The West Midlands region elected 59 Members of Parliament across 6 counties; Herefordshire, Shropshire, Staffordshire, Warwickshire, the West Midlands metropolitan county and Worcestershire.

Herefordshire 
Herefordshire elected 2 Members of Parliament in 2 seats – 2 county constituencies.

Shropshire

Staffordshire

Warwickshire

West Midlands

City of Birmingham

Coventry and Solihull

Dudley and Sandwell

Walsall and Wolverhampton

Worcestershire

Yorkshire and the Humber 

Yorkshire and the Humber elected 56 Members of Parliament across 4 counties; East Riding of Yorkshire, North Yorkshire, South Yorkshire and West Yorkshire.

Northern Ireland 

Northern Ireland elected 18 Members of Parliament across the 6 counties of Northern Ireland.

Scotland 

Scotland elected 72 Members of Parliament across the 8 regions.

Central Scotland 
Central Scotland elected 10 Members of Parliament.

Glasgow 
Glasgow elected 10 Members of Parliament in 10 seats – all in borough constituencies.

Highlands and Islands 
The Scottish Highlands and Islands elected 7 Members of Parliament.

Lothians 
The Lothians elected 9 Members of Parliament.

Mid Scotland and Fife 
Mid Scotland and Fife elected 9 Members of Parliament.

North East Scotland 
North East Scotland including Aberdeenshire elected 9 Members of Parliament in 9 seats – 5 borough and 4 county constituencies.

South Scotland 
The South of Scotland elected 9 Members of Parliament.

West Scotland 
The West of Scotland elected 9 Members of Parliament.

Wales 

Wales elected 40 Members of Parliament.

See also 

 List of United Kingdom Parliament constituencies (1997 to present) by region

Notes

References 

Election results in the United Kingdom
1997 United Kingdom general election
1997 elections in the United Kingdom
Results of United Kingdom general elections by parliamentary constituency